Wilkin Emilio Ramírez (born October 25, 1985) is Dominican former professional baseball outfielder. He has played in Major League Baseball (MLB) for the Detroit Tigers, Atlanta Braves and the Minnesota Twins.

Playing career

Minor Leagues
Ramírez signed with the Detroit Tigers at the age of 17 as an undrafted free agent in 2003. He began playing for the Gulf Coast Tigers in the Gulf Coast League in 2003, but missed the entire 2004 season due to a shoulder injury. In 2005, he joined the Low-A West Michigan Whitecaps in the Midwest League, where he established himself as a prospect by hitting 16 home runs with 21 stolen bases. Whitecaps manager Matt Walbeck praised Ramirez's work ethic: "He's got a very good attitude, he likes to play." Baseball America named him the #5 prospect in the organization. In 2006, he played for the Single A Lakeland Flying Tigers, where he dealt with injuries that shortened his season.  In 2007, he split time between Lakeland and the Erie SeaWolves of the Double A Eastern League.  2008 saw Ramírez spend most of the season in Erie before earning a call-up to the Triple A Toledo Mud Hens.  After the 2008 season Ramírez was named the 6th best Tigers prospect by Baseball America.

In 2008, Ramírez participated in the All-Star Futures Game during the Major League Baseball All-Star Game weekend.  He even participated in the 2010 Futures Game for the World team.

Ramírez has also participated in the Dominican Winter League.

Major Leagues

Atlanta Braves
On July 31, 2010, Ramirez was traded to the Atlanta Braves for a player to be named later.

He had his contract purchased by the Braves on May 22, 2011.

Minnesota Twins
Ramirez signed a minor league contract with the Minnesota Twins on November 17, 2012. He made his 2013 season debut with the Twins in the bottom of the 6th inning on April 1.  He was outrighted off the roster on October 22, 2013. He re-signed with the Twins on a minor league contract on December 23, 2014. He re-signed with the Twins on a minor league contract on January 7, 2015. On January 12, 2015, he was assigned to AAA Rochester Red Wings. After the season, he was selected to the roster for the Dominican Republic national baseball team at the 2015 WBSC Premier12.

Bridgeport Bluefish
On March 22, 2016, Ramirez signed with the Bridgeport Bluefish of the Atlantic League of Professional Baseball. He became a free agent after the 2016 season and retired during the offseason.

References

External links

1985 births
Living people
Atlanta Braves players
Bridgeport Bluefish players
Detroit Tigers players
Dominican Republic expatriate baseball players in the United States
Erie SeaWolves players
Fort Myers Miracle players
Gulf Coast Tigers players
Gwinnett Braves players
Lakeland Flying Tigers players
Lakeland Tigers players

Major League Baseball players from the Dominican Republic
Minnesota Twins players
New Britain Rock Cats players
Rochester Red Wings players
Tigres del Licey players
Toledo Mud Hens players
Toros del Este players
West Michigan Whitecaps players
2015 WBSC Premier12 players